Kazimierz Abramowicz (1889–1936) was a Polish mathematician and professor at the University of Poznan.

References

Polish mathematicians
1889 births
1936 deaths